Internet slang